Greville Richard Vernon (1835 – 19 February 1909) was a Liberal Unionist politician in Scotland.  He was the Member of Parliament (MP) for South Ayrshire from 1886 to 1892. He was the youngest son of Robert Vernon, 1st Baron Lyveden.

References

External links 
 

1835 births
1909 deaths
Liberal Unionist Party MPs for Scottish constituencies
Members of the Parliament of the United Kingdom for Scottish constituencies
UK MPs 1886–1892
Younger sons of barons